The Algerian Desert is located in north-central Africa and is part of the Sahara Desert. The desert occupies more than four-fifths of Algerian territory. Its expansion starts from the Saharan Atlas as a stony desert, gradually changing into a sand dune desert inland. The plateau of the Tassili n'Ajjer is located in the southeast, and its outstanding collection of prehistoric rock art saw it added to the UNESCO World Heritage List in 1982. 

Cities and towns such as Ouargla, Adrar, and particularly In Salah are among the hottest places in the Sahara.

References

Sahara
Deserts of Algeria